Saccus may refer to:
 Saccus, Roman cognomen, see List of Roman cognomina
 Saccus, a genus of plants in the family Moraceae, synonym of Artocarpus
 Saccus, in anatomy:
 Saccus endolymphaticus
 Saccus lacrimalis
 Saccus caecus caudodorsalis
 Saccus caecus caudoventralis
 Saccus conjunctivae
 Saccus cranialis
 Saccus dorsalis

 Saccus, in entomology:
 The saccus is an anatomical structure of male lepidoptera genitalia, being an anterior extension of the vinculum